Vincenzo Ercolano (also Vincenzo Herculani) (1517 – 29 October 1586) was a Roman Catholic prelate who served as Bishop of Perugia (1579–1586),
Bishop of Imola (1573–1579),
and Bishop of Sarno (1569–1573).

Biography
Vincenzo Ercolano was born in 1517 and ordained a priest in the Order of Preachers.
On 14 December 1569, he was appointed during the papacy of Pope Pius V as Bishop of Sarno. 
On 8 January 1570, he was consecrated bishop by Scipione Rebiba, Cardinal-Priest of Sant'Angelo in Pescheria, with Galeazzo Gegald, Bishop Emeritus of Bagnoregio, and Umberto Locati, Bishop of Bagnoregio, serving as co-consecrators. 
On 9 February 1573, he was appointed during the papacy of Pope Gregory XIII as Bishop of Imola. 
On 27 November 1579, he was appointed during the papacy of Pope Gregory XIII as Bishop of Perugia. 
He served as Bishop of Perugia until his death on 29 October 1586. 
While bishop, he was the principal co-consecrator of Baldassarre Giustiniani, Bishop of Venosa.

References

External links and additional sources
 (for Chronology of Bishops) 
 (for Chronology of Bishops) 
 (for Chronology of Bishops) 
 (for Chronology of Bishops) 
 (for Chronology of Bishops) 
 (for Chronology of Bishops) 

16th-century Italian Roman Catholic bishops
Bishops appointed by Pope Pius V
Bishops appointed by Pope Gregory XIII
1517 births
1586 deaths
Dominican bishops